The 2020 Air Force Falcons football team represented the United States Air Force Academy in the 2020 NCAA Division I FBS football season. The Falcons were led by 14th-year head coach Troy Calhoun and played their home games at Falcon Stadium in Colorado Springs, Colorado. They competed as members of the Mountain West Conference.

Previous season

The Falcons finished the 2019 season 11–2, 7–1 in Mountain West play to finish in second place in the Mountain Division. Following the season they were invited to the Cheez-It Bowl where they defeated Washington State by a score of 31–21.

Preseason

Award watch lists

Mountain West media days
The Mountain West media days were originally scheduled to take place from July 27–29, 2020, virtually, but were canceled.

Media poll
The preseason poll was released on July 21, 2020. The Falcons were predicted to finish in third place in the MW Mountain Division. The divisions were later suspended for the 2020 season.

Preseason All−Mountain West Team
The Falcons had three players selected to the preseason All−Mountain West Team; two from the offense and one from the defense.

Offense

Parker Ferguson – OL

Nolan Laufenberg – OL

Defense

Demonte Meeks – LB

Schedule
Air Force announced its 2020 football schedule on February 27, 2020. The original 2020 schedule consisted of 6 home and 6 away games in the regular season. On August 10, 2020, the Mountain West Conference announced the suspension of the football season due to the COVID-19 pandemic. Due to the nature of their institutions and rivalries, Air Force kept scheduled games with Army and Navy in order to play for the Commander-in-Chief's Trophy in the fall. Scheduled games against Duquesne and Purdue from the original schedule were canceled and Mountain West Conference play was suspended. On September 25, the Mountain West announced that their Board of Directors had met and approved plans to resume the football season. The revised schedule was announced on October 1, with conference play beginning on October 24. The Falcons had six conference games scheduled, two less than their MW counterparts to account for their service academy match-ups. The Army game, originally scheduled for November 7, was postponed indefinitely on November 5 with both schools saying they would reschedule the game if possible. The Wyoming game, originally scheduled for November 14, was canceled on November 8. The Colorado State game, originally scheduled for November 26, was canceled on November 25. On that same day, the Air Force-Army game was rescheduled for December 19 at Michie Stadium.

Source:

Personnel

Game summaries

Navy

at San Jose State

Boise State

at Wyoming

New Mexico

Colorado State

at Utah State

at Army

Source for Match-up Records:

References

Air Force
Air Force Falcons football seasons
Air Force Falcons football